Léri–Weill dyschondrosteosis or LWD is a rare pseudoautosomal dominant genetic disorder which results in dwarfism with short forearms and legs (mesomelic dwarfism) and a bayonet-like deformity of the forearms (Madelung's deformity).

Causes
It is caused by mutations in the short-stature homeobox gene found in the pseudoautosomal region PAR1 of the X and Y chromosomes, at band Xp22.33 or Yp11.32.

SHOX gene deletions have been identified as the major cause of Leri–Weill syndrome.

Leri–Weill dyschondrosteosis is characterized by mesomelic short stature, with bowing of the radius more so than the ulna in the forearms and bowing of the tibia while sparing the fibula.

Diagnosis

Diagnosis is made following genetic blood testing.

Treatment

History
LWD was first described in 1929 by André Léri and Jean A. Weill.

References

External links 

Growth disorders
Transcription factor deficiencies
Rare diseases